Margaret Talbot is an American essayist and non-fiction writer. She is also the daughter of the veteran Warner Bros. actor Lyle Talbot, whom she profiled in an October 2012 The New Yorker article and in her book The Entertainer: Movies, Magic and My Father's Twentieth Century (Riverhead Books, 2012). She is also the co-author with her brother David Talbot of a book about political activists in the 1960s, By the Light of Burning Dreams (HarperCollins, 2021).

Life
She is a staff writer at The New Yorker. She has also written for The New Republic, The New York Times Magazine, and The Atlantic Monthly.  and was a regular panelist on the Slate podcast "The DoubleX Gabfest".

Her first book, The Entertainer: Movies, Magic, and My Father's Twentieth Century, was published in November 2012 by Riverhead.

Her second book, co-authored with David Talbot, "By the Light of Burning Dreams: The Triumphs and Tragedies of the Second American Revolution," was published in June 2021 by HarperCollins.

She was formerly a Senior Fellow at the New America Foundation.

Her brother Stephen Talbot is a public television documentary producer. Her nephew is filmmaker Joe Talbot.

Awards 
 1999 Whiting Award

Bibliography

Books

Essays and reporting

Anthologies

Book reviews

———————
Notes

Notes

External links
Profile at The Whiting Foundation

American essayists
Living people
The New Yorker people
Year of birth missing (living people)
Place of birth missing (living people)